The Faculty of Arts of the University of Szeged.

Notable persons
 János Csengery, philosophy
 Zoltán Gombocz, philologist
 Sándor Imre, pedagogy
 Attila József, poet
 Sándor Márki, medieval history
 Károly Marót, philosophy
 Ágoston Pável, ethnology
 István Schneller, pedagogy
 Sándor Sik, Hungarian literature
 Antal Szerb, author
 József Szinnyei, history of literature
 István Tömörkény, writer, archaeologist and journalist
 Hildebrand Dezső Várkonyi psychologist

Faculties of the University of Szeged